Stefan Gates (born 19 September 1967) is a British television presenter, author, broadcaster and live-show performer. He has written books about food, cooking and science. He has presented over 20 TV series, mostly for the BBC, including Cooking in the Danger Zone about unusual food from the world's more dangerous and difficult places. He develops half of these TV series himself, including the CBBC children's food adventure series Gastronuts and Incredible Edibles.

Gates presented BBC One's Food Factory. He wrote and presented the BBC Two series E Numbers: An Edible Adventure, Full On Food and the BBC Four series Feasts.

Gates has also written and presented two BBC Four documentaries: Calf's Head and Coffee: The Golden Age of English Food on food history, and Can Eating Insects Save the World? on entomophagy. He appears as a guest on TV and radio programmes including Newsnight, Loose Ends, BBC Breakfast, Sunday Brunch, The Wright Stuff, Iron Chef, Blue Peter, The Alan Titchmarsh Show and This Morning. Gates is a panellist on BBC Radio 4's Kitchen Cabinet and has made two radio documentaries. He also performs live shows and lectures, many at science and food festivals.

Early life
Gates was born in London. As a child, along with his sister Samantha, was photographed for knitwear patterns and appeared separately in commercials and TV dramas, including Poldark. They were the child models on the cover of English rock band Led Zeppelin's album Houses of the Holy (1973).

Education
Gates was educated at Pembroke College, Oxford, in the 1980s, where he took a degree in English.

TV career
After leaving Oxford University, Gates spent the first 16 years of his working life in film and TV - the jobs were varied and included: Assistant director, scriptwriter, director and producer, finally ending up in BBC Comedy as a development producer. Due to his fascination with unusual foods he started writing about them, and this led to him becoming a presenter and co-writer on the BBC Two series Full on Food in the winter of 2004.

Cooking in the Danger Zone
Gates presents food programmes including three series of Cooking in the Danger Zone, which has been shown in 25 countries, as well as broadcast globally on BBC World News. In each episode of the series he visits a dangerous part of the world such as Afghanistan, Chernobyl, Haiti and Burma where the living is not easy and the food is unusual. This has gained him a reputation for travelling to difficult or extreme places and eating unusual or shocking food. The series won the Slow Food award for best TV series at the 2008 Slow Food On Film Festival in Bologna and was nominated for the 2009 Guild of Food Writers Food and Travel award.

Other TV and radio programmes
Gates presents a children's TV series, based on his Gastronaut concept, called gastronauts. produced by Objective Productions. The series was nominated for the 2009 Guild of Food Writers Broadcast of the Year award. He wrote and presented Feasts, broadcast on BBC Four in 2009 – it consists of three episodes filmed in Japan, Mexico and India. In 2010 he presented a three-part series on food additives for BBC Two, E Numbers: An Edible Adventure. In 2012, he took over the role of presenting of Food Factory on BBC One, after former presenter Jimmy Doherty left the BBC to join Channel 4.

He also appears regularly on Five's The Wright Stuff and BBC Two's Something for the Weekend the Good Food Channel's Market Kitchen. In 2010 he presented a documentary for Radio 4, Stefan Gates' Cover Story, concerning his part in the Led Zeppelin Houses of the Holy photoshoot.

Writing
Gates writes articles for newspapers and magazines including New Scientist and BBC Food and has written eight books. His first children's book Incredible Edibles (2012) won the 2013 Information Book Award. His first book was Gastronaut: Adventures in Food for the Romantic, the Foolhardy, and the Brave, winner of the 2005 Gourmand World Cookbook Awards Best Food Literature Book. In 2008 a companion to the TV series Cooking in the Danger Zone was published by BBC Books titled In the Danger Zone. He has also written 101 Dishes to Eat Before You Die, Stefan Gates On E Numbers, which is a companion to the TV series E Numbers: An Edible Adventure and The Extraordinary Cookbook (Kyle Books 2010).

TV 
Full On Food BBC Two 2004
Cooking in the Danger Zone series 1-3 BBC Two and BBC Four 2006-08
Food Uncut UKTV Food 2007 
Gastronuts I BBC One and CBBC 2008-09
Feasts BBC Four 2009
Gastronuts II BBC One and CBBC 2010
E Numbers: An Edible Adventure BBC Two 2010
Ecomaths BBC Learning 2012
Incredible Edibles I CBBC 2012
CBBC's Olympic Challenge CBBC 2012
Food Factory BBC One 2012Calf's Head and Coffee: The Golden Age of English Food BBC Four 2012Can Eating Insects Save the World? BBC Four Spring 2013Incredible Edibles II CBBC Spring 2013Harvest BBC2 and BBC Learning 2013Ecomaths BBC Learning 2013Food and Drink BBC2 2014Disaster Chefs CBBC 2014Gastrolab BBC Learning 2015The Secrets of Our Favourite Dishes BBC Learning 2015The Wright Stuff Channel 5 2015 – 2018Jeremy Vine Show Channel 5 2018Travel with a Goat Impact 2019Supermarket Secrets Revealed Channel 5 2019

 YouTube 
Since 2015 Gates has operated the YouTube channel Gastronaut TV. The channel has over 50 videos and over 3,000 subscribers. Videos include recipes, science, things to try at home, and clips from his TV series.

 Radio Stefan Gates' Cover Story Radio 4 2010What Would Jesus Eat? BBC Radio 4 2011

 Books Gastronaut (2005), In The Danger Zone (2008), 101 Dishes to Eat Before You Die (2009), Stefan Gates On E Numbers (2010), The Extraordinary Cookbook (2010), Incredible Edibles (2012), Insects: An Edible Field Guide (2017), Fartology: The Extraordinary Science Behind the Humble Fart (2018), 

Live shows
Gates performs "food stunt shows", mostly at science festivals such as Cambridge Science Festival,  Cheltenham Science Festival, The Big Bang Fair and also at schools, theatres and food festivals including the BBC Good Food Show'' and the Ideal Home Show.

Personal life
Gates is married to food photographer Georgia Glynn Smith. They have two children.

References

External links
 Stefan Gates' web site
 CBBC Gastronuts game
 BBC site for 'Feasts'
 BBC site for the first series of Cooking in the Danger Zone
 BBC site for the second series of Cooking in the Danger Zone
 

Living people
Alumni of Pembroke College, Oxford
English food writers
English television presenters
1967 births
People from Cambridge